The International Animated Film Association (French: Association Internationale du Film d'Animation, ASIFA)  is an international non-profit organization founded in 1960 in Annecy, France, well-known animation artists, including Canadian animator Norman McLaren. There are now more than 30 chapters of the Association located in many countries of the world.

The organization's ASIFA-Hollywood chapter presents the annual Annie Awards.

ASIFA's board of directors includes animation professionals from all over the world. They meet at ASIFA-sponsored animation film festivals on a regular basis. Some of the most well-known festivals include the Annecy International Animated Film Festival in France, the Ottawa International Animated Film Festival in Canada, the Animae Caribe in the Caribbean, the Hiroshima International Animation Festival in Japan, and the Zagreb World Festival of Animated Films in Croatia. The annual Annie Awards are presented by the Hollywood branch of the International Animated Film Association.

Chapters

Presidents

See also
International Animation Day

References

External links
ASIFA's official Web site

 
Organizations established in 1960
Annecy
Organizations based in France